The 2016 International Championship was a professional ranking snooker tournament that took place between 23 and 30 October 2016 at the Baihu Media Broadcasting Centre in Daqing, China. It was the eighth ranking event of the 2016/2017 season.

John Higgins was the defending champion but he lost 2–6 to Ding Junhui in the quarter-finals.

Mark Selby won his 9th ranking title by beating Ding Junhui 10–1 in the final. This match was a repeat of the 2016 World Championship final, in which Selby beat Ding by the 18–14 scoreline, and also the second consecutive ranking event final in China to feature both players, previous one, at the Shanghai Masters, being won 10–6 by Ding.

Prize fund

The breakdown of prize money for this year is shown below:

 Winner: £125,000
 Runner-up: £65,000
 Semi-final: £30,000
 Quarter-final: £17,500
 Last 16: £12,000
 Last 32: £7,000
 Last 64: £4,000

 Televised highest break: £1,000
 Total: £657,000

The "rolling 147 prize" for a maximum break stood at £5,000.

Wildcard round
These matches were played in Daqing on 23 October 2016.

Main draw

Final

Qualifying
These matches were held between 29 September and 1 October 2016 at the Preston Guild Hall in Preston, England. Matches involved John Higgins, Ding Junhui, Liang Wenbo and Mark Selby, were played on 23 October 2016 in China. All matches were best of 11 frames.

Century breaks

Qualifying stage centuries

 138  Ken Doherty
 136  Jack Lisowski
 135  Anthony McGill
 134  Robin Hull
 130  Shaun Murphy
 130  Chen Zhe
 128, 122, 107  Ali Carter
 128, 121  Jak Jones
 127, 100  Judd Trump
 126  Mark Williams
 118  Tom Ford

 109  Martin Gould
 108  Jimmy Robertson
 106, 105  Stephen Maguire
 105  Ryan Day
 104  Hossein Vafaei
 102  Mark Davis
 102  David Grace
 100  Stuart Carrington
 100  Michael White
 100  Ben Woollaston

Televised stage centuries

 145  John Higgins
 145  Xu Si
 139, 136  Li Hang
 137, 136, 101  Joe Perry
 137, 133, 125, 120, 119, 108, 102, 102, 100  Judd Trump
 137, 101  Ronnie O'Sullivan
 137  Mark Joyce
 135, 129, 104, 101  Liang Wenbo
 134, 130, 125, 121, 116, 104, 102  Ding Junhui
 134, 111  John Astley
 133  Ken Doherty
 132, 127, 125, 122, 103, 100  Mark Selby
 132, 104  Stephen Maguire
 132  Tom Ford
 131, 127, 125, 101  Stuart Bingham
 130, 124, 106  Ricky Walden

 127, 101  Michael Holt
 124, 115  Kurt Maflin
 123, 107  Neil Robertson
 120  Eden Sharav
 114  Jak Jones
 114  Mark Williams
 113  Dominic Dale
 112  Wang Yuchen
 110  Sunny Akani
 106, 102  Sam Baird
 106, 102  Zhou Yuelong
 105, 104  Aditya Mehta
 102  David Grace
 102  Marco Fu
 101  Ross Muir
 101  Shaun Murphy

References

2016
2016 in snooker
2016 in Chinese sport
Sport in Daqing
October 2016 sports events in China